Deal is the Greek version of Deal or No Deal. It airs on Alpha TV and it started broadcasting in January 2006 . It is hosted by Christos Ferentinos, who also hosts the Greek version of Fort Boyard on Star Channel. There are 22 boxes held by 22 potential contestants coming from various Greek prefectures. Each episode ultimately features one contestant.

Original edition
During the first round, players answer a multiple choice question and the day's contestant is selected randomly among those who answered correctly. The monetary prizes range from €0.01 to €200,000, but only half of the prize is given to the contestant. The other half is given to a viewer that has participated in a text message contest going on during the broadcast. Usually, three of the boxes contain items of little value (such as a brick, an umbrella, or a souvlaki). Sometimes, the Banker offers a box exchange instead of cash.

A player won the top prize after refusing the offer of €80,000. The show ended in February 2008, before returning in October 2010.

Original Box Values
NOTE: 
 Some small values may be replaced with joke prizes.
 The €10,000 value is sometimes replaced by a "ΑΥΤΟΚΙΝΗΤΟ" ("car" in Greek language).

2010 edition
The daytime version of the show returned in October 2010, with the top prize reduced to €150,000, and further adjustments made to the board. A wildcard amount known as 'X' was to the board, which represents an unknown amount. When X is discovered, players choose an envelope from many in a container, each with a different concealed amount, to find out what the wildcard amount will be. The wildcard amount ranges from €0.25 to €25,000.

Box Values

2016 edition
The daytime version returned again on October 3, 2016, on Alpha TV, with the top prize reduced to €60,000.

Box Values

Super Deal
A spin-off of the original Greek "Deal", this version aired on the same network (ANT1) on Saturday and Sunday nights until December 2007. 26 similarly dressed female models hold 26 cases with the top prize being €500,000 (€300,000 more than the grand prize of the original show). The contestant earns 100% of the prize. The show is supervised by lawyer Yannis Marakakis, a former model and former athlete. This version is almost identical to the US version of Deal or No Deal, hosted by Howie Mandel.

The highest prize won was 260,000 euros. This was achieved by a 19-year-old Greek medical student in 2007.

Case Values

External links
Official website 

ANT1 original programming
Alpha TV original programming
Greek game shows
2005 Greek television series debuts
2011 Greek television series endings
2016 Greek television series debuts
2000s Greek television series
2010s Greek television series
Greek-language television shows
Television shows set in Athens
Deal or No Deal